The following lists events that happened during 2014 in Panama.

Incumbents
President: Ricardo Martinelli (until 1 July), Juan Carlos Varela (starting 1 July)
Vice President: Juan Carlos Varela (until 1 July), Isabel Saint Malo (starting 1 July)

Events

March
 March 5 - Nicolás Maduro, the President of Venezuela, severs diplomatic and political ties with Panama, accusing Panama of being involved in a conspiracy against the Venezuelan government.

References

 
Years of the 21st century in Panama
Panama
2010s in Panama
Panama